Dalkhai is a popular folk dance of the Adivasis of Odisha, India.

Etymology 
The dance originates in the Sambalpur district in Odisha. The name derives from dancers shouting ‘Dalkhai Bo!’ at the beginning and end of each stanza sung in the dance.

Description 
The dance normally corresponds to the Hindu epics such as the love story of Radha and Krishna.

It is performed in various festivals such as Bhaijiuntia, Phagun Puni and Nuakhai. The dance is popular among the Binjhal, Kuda, Mirdha, Sama and other tribes of Western Odisha. Male dancers address their female counterparts during the performance and flirt with them.

The dance is accompanied by a rich orchestra of folk music played by a number of instruments known as 'dhol', 'Nisan' (typically a giant drum made of iron case), 'Tamki' (a tiny one sided drum 6" in diameter played by two sticks), 'Tasa' (a one sided drum) and 'Mahuri'. However, the 'Dhol' player controls the tempo while dancing in front of the girls

Women  wear a colorful printed Sambalpuri saree. They also tie a scarf on their shoulders holding the ends in both the hands. Various traditional pieces of jewelry such as the necklace, bangles, etc. are worn by the performers to complete the look.

References

Culture of Odisha
Indian folk dances